Notogibbula bicarinata, common name "Cox's top shell", is a species of sea snail, a marine gastropod mollusc in the family Trochidae, the top shells.

Description
The shell has an orbicularly conical shape and is moderately umbilicated. It is rather solid and smooth but not glossy. The height and width of the shell are almost equal, with a maximum width of 1 cm. The pink or fawn shell shows dark purple and brown markings with a pattern of zig-zag brown lines, and with a few broad pure white flames descending from the sutures and interrupted on the keels with brownish red. The five whorls have a strong shoulder and basal angulations. They contain two prominent rounded keels, one next the suture; slightly concave between the suture and upper keel, and a little concave between the keels, The whorls are finely spirally ridged and decussated with exceedingly fine and close oblique longitudinal lines. The sculpture of the shell shows microscopic spiral threads. The convex base of the shell is reticulated with gray and minutely spotted with red. It is finely concentrically ridged and decussated like the whorls, the ridges increasing in size toward the umbilicus. The white aperture is round and occupies about half the length of the shell. The parietal callus and the curved columella have both a smooth appearance. The white, narrow umbilicus goes deep into the shell.

Distribution
This species inhabits the shallow subtidal zone of sandy bays, among seaweed and seagrass along the coasts of southern Western Australia to New South Wales and Tasmania.

References

 Adams, A. 1854. Monograph of Stomatellinae. A sub-family of Trochidae. 827-846, pls 173-175 in Sowerby, G.B. (ed.). Thesaurus Conchyliorum or monographs of genera of shells. London : Sowerby Vol. 2 pp. 439–899
 Angas, G.F. 1867. Descriptions of thirty-two new species of marine shells from the coast of New South Wales. Proceedings of the Zoological Society of London 1867: 110-117, pl. 13 
 Fischer, P. 1879. Genres Calcar, Trochus, Xenophora, Tectarius et Risella. 337-463, 120 pls in Keiner, L.C. (ed.). Spécies general et iconographie des coquilles vivantes. Paris : J.B. Baillière Vol. 3. 
 Hedley, C. 1918. A checklist of the marine fauna of New South Wales. Part 1. Journal and Proceedings of the Royal Society of New South Wales 51: M1-M120
 Iredale, T. 1924. Results from Roy Bell's molluscan collections. Proceedings of the Linnean Society of New South Wales 49(3): 179-279, pl. 33-36 
 Cotton, B.C. 1959. South Australian Mollusca. Archaeogastropoda. Handbook of the Flora and Fauna of South Australia. Adelaide : South Australian Government Printer 449 pp
 Macpherson, J.H. & Gabriel, C.J. 1962. Marine Molluscs of Victoria. Melbourne : Melbourne University Press & National Museum of Victoria 475 pp.
 Iredale, T. & McMichael, D.F. 1962. A reference list of the marine Mollusca of New South Wales. Memoirs of the Australian Museum 11: 1-109
 Wilson, B. 1993. Australian Marine Shells. Prosobranch Gastropods. Kallaroo, Western Australia : Odyssey Publishing Vol. 1 408 pp.

External links
 

bicarinata
Gastropods of Australia
Gastropods described in 1854